Justice Humphreys may refer to:

Allison B. Humphreys, associate justice of the Tennessee Supreme Court
Parry Wayne Humphreys, associate justice of the Tennessee Supreme Court
Thomas H. Humphreys, associate justice of the Arkansas Supreme Court

See also
Thomas E. Humphrey, an associate justice of the Maine Supreme Judicial Court